Jonathan Callum Brownlee  (born 30 April 1990) is a British professional duathlete and triathlete. He is a six-time World champion (once World Triathlon Series, twice World Sprint Triathlon, three-time World Triathlon Mixed Relay), and one-time Olympic champion (mixed relay) in triathlon.

Brownlee was the 2012 Triathlon World Champion, and the silver medallist in 2013 and 2016. Brownlee is also a two-time World Sprint Triathlon Champion when it was held as a separate event between 2010 and 2011. He is the former Under-23 Triathlon World Champion (2010).

He won the bronze medal in the individual triathlon at the London 2012 Olympic Games, the silver medal in the same race at the Rio 2016 Olympic Games and the gold medal in the mixed relay at the 2020 Summer Olympics in Tokyo.

Brownlee also finished the 2021 Super League Triathlon Championship Series in 3rd place, behind fellow Team Relay member Alex Yee and Olympic bronze medallist, Hayden Wilde of New Zealand. He had finished on the podium at 3 of the 4 Championship Series races. In 2022 he also finished in 3rd place overall. He finished in second place at the series finale in NEOM, Saudi Arabia, ahead of overall Champion Hayden Wilde and behind 2nd placed Matthew Hauser. His brother, Alistair Brownlee, is also a triathlon champion, having won the gold medal at both the 2012 and 2016 Olympics.

As of 2022, Jonathan is considered the most decorated triathlete in Olympic history, the only triathlete to achieve 3 Olympic medals, while his brother Alistair, with his two gold medals is considered the most successful triathlete in Olympic history. Between them, the Brownlee brothers, along with Spanish pair Mario Mola and Javier Gomez, and latterly Frenchman Vincent Luis were the dominant male 'Olympic' distance triathletes for most of the 2010's.

Career
Brownlee was educated at Bradford Grammar School before attending the University of Leeds, where he studied history. He swam for Aireborough Swimming club and still holds the record for the A&W boys 9/10 yrs 2 lengths backstroke, which was set in 2000. He is a member of the Bingley Harriers and is coached by Malcolm Brown and Jack Maitland at the British Triathlon Federation's High Performance Centre, based at Leeds Metropolitan University's Carnegie Centre.

His father Keith was a runner, while his mother Cathy was a swimmer. His older brother Alistair Brownlee holds two Olympic titles in the triathlon event (2012, 2016), and is a two-time Triathlon World Champion (2009, 2011). His younger brother Edward, who was a very successful academic, is also a keen sportsman, but prefers rugby and water polo over the triathlon.

Brownlee was the British youth champion in both the triathlon and duathlon in 2006 and 2007. In 2008 he won bronze medals at both the ETU European Junior Triathlon Championships and ITU World Junior Championships, and placed 17th in his ITU World Championship Series début event in Kitzbühel. During the 2009 season he also won gold in the triathlon at the Australian Youth Olympic Festival and competed in two races in the 2009 ITU World Championship Series, finishing 13th in Kitzbühel and 27th in London.

In 2010, Brownlee represented the French club ECS Triathlon and took part in the prestigious French Club Championship Series Lyonnaise des Eaux, also called Grand Prix. In Dunkirk, at the first triathlon of this circuit, he won the gold medal in the individual ranking which helped EC Sartrouville to win the silver medal.

Despite a 15-second penalty, Jonathan took the bronze medal in the Triathlon event at the London 2012 Olympic Games, his brother Alistair taking gold.

He took gold in the mixed triathlon team relay at the 2014 Commonwealth Games, with his brother Alistair, Vicky Holland and Jodie Stimpson.

At the 2020 Summer Olympics in Tokyo, Brownlee took the second-leg of the inaugural triathlon mixed relay, with Jessica Learmonth, Georgia Taylor-Brown and Alex Yee, and took the gold medal in a time of 1:23:41. Brownlee also finished 3rd in the 2021 Super League Triathlon Championship Series.

Brownlee was appointed Member of the Order of the British Empire (MBE) in the 2022 New Year Honours for services to triathlon.

ITU competitions
In the five years from 2006 to 2010, Jonathan Brownlee took part in 23 ITU competitions and achieved 14 top ten positions, winning five gold medals.

The following list is based upon the official ITU rankings and the Athlete's Profile Page. Unless indicated otherwise, the following events are triathlons (Olympic Distance) and belong to the Elite category.

Key: BG = British Gas (the sponsor); DNF = Did not finish; DNS = Did not start; U23 = Under 23

Gallery

References

External links

 
 
 
 
 
 
 

1990 births
Living people
English male triathletes
British male triathletes
Sportspeople from Leeds
Alumni of the University of Leeds
People educated at Bradford Grammar School
Triathletes at the 2012 Summer Olympics
Triathletes at the 2016 Summer Olympics
Olympic triathletes of Great Britain
Olympic gold medallists for Great Britain
Olympic silver medallists for Great Britain
Olympic bronze medallists for Great Britain
Olympic medalists in triathlon
Medalists at the 2012 Summer Olympics
Medalists at the 2016 Summer Olympics
Medalists at the 2020 Summer Olympics
Triathletes at the 2014 Commonwealth Games
Commonwealth Games gold medallists for England
Commonwealth Games silver medallists for England
Commonwealth Games medallists in triathlon
Triathletes at the 2018 Commonwealth Games
People from Bramhope
Triathletes at the 2020 Summer Olympics
Members of the Order of the British Empire
Medallists at the 2018 Commonwealth Games